Hazel Grove railway station is a junction on both the Stockport to Buxton and Stockport to Sheffield lines, serving the village of Hazel Grove, Greater Manchester, England.

History

The station was built for the Stockport, Disley and Whaley Bridge Railway, by the London and North Western Railway, and opened on 9 June 1857. From 1923 until 1948, it was owned by the London Midland and Scottish Railway and, following nationalisation, it was operated by the London Midland Region of British Railways.

There was once another station in the village, Hazel Grove (Midland) station, on the Midland Railway's line from New Mills South Junction to Manchester Central, via Cheadle Heath; this opened in 1902, but it was less conveniently situated and closed in 1917.

The line was extremely expensive to build with extensive earthworks. The navvies were accommodated in specially-built houses near the Rising Sun pub, which still exist and are known as the Navvy Mansions. The line from Edgeley Junction, just south of Stockport, to Hazel Grove was electrified in 1981 on the 25 kV AC overhead system.

The signal box on the Buxton-bound platform remains in use. This controls the junction between the Buxton line and the chord linking it to the route through Disley Tunnel towards Sheffield at the country end of the station; it also controls a pair of carriage sidings at the Stockport end used for stabling trains that terminate here.

The single-track Hazel Grove Chord opened in 1986. This allowed trains to/from Stockport and Manchester Piccadilly to access the former Manchester Central – New Mills South Junction line, just south of Hazel Grove station; this provides a faster route between Manchester and Sheffield than the former route via Romiley and New Mills Central. The chord also enables Sheffield trains to serve Stockport and run to/from Liverpool Lime Street.

Facilities
The station is staffed all week, with its ticket office on platform 1 open 06:05-19:00 weekdays (until 20:00 on Fridays only), 07:00-20:00 Saturdays and 09:00-16:30 Sundays.  There are waiting rooms on both platforms, toilets in the main building and a small coffee shop on platform 2.  Train running details are provided via automated announcements, timetable posters and digital information screens.  Step-free access is available to both platforms via the lifts built into the footbridge linking the platforms.

Services
The service terminating here does not run on Sundays.

Many regular services operated by East Midlands Railway and TransPennine Express pass through the station but do not stop.

Recent history
Class 323 units operated the hourly Hazel Grove to Manchester Piccadilly service but, from October 2015 until May 2018, diesel multiple units ran the service as the route was extended to run to Preston and through to Blackpool North, to replace the weekday service from Liverpool Lime Street that is now operated by EMUs.

Electric operation returned at the May 2018 timetable change, with one train per hour to/from Piccadilly worked by Class 319 EMUs.  This was part of a major timetable revamp that saw 3 trains to Manchester each hour off-peak on weekdays and Saturdays and 2 each hour to Buxton.  Regular running to destinations beyond Manchester ceased temporarily at the May 2018 timetable change. Through running resumed in May 2019, with an hourly Monday-Saturday service running to the now-electrified  using Class 331 EMUs. As of December 2022, this service has reverted to terminating at  using Class 323s.

References

 Radford, B., (1988) Midland Though The Peak Unicorn Books
 Harrison, P., (2006) Striking A Chord With Electric

External links

Railscot – Hazel Grove

Railway stations in the Metropolitan Borough of Stockport
DfT Category D stations
Former London and North Western Railway stations
Railway stations served by East Midlands Railway
Northern franchise railway stations
Railway stations in Great Britain opened in 1857
1857 establishments in England